Murya can refer to:
Murya, Azerbaijan, a village and municipality in the Lerik Rayon of Azerbaijan
Murya, Russia, a selo in Saldykelsky Rural Okrug of Lensky District in the Sakha Republic